Mohamed Badawi (born 1965 in Omdurman, Sudan) is a Sudanese linguist and publisher, writer, musician and composer, as well as founder of the "Sudan Education Project". Since 2019, he also has been elected as member of the city council of Konstanz, Germany, where he has lived since 1997.

Life 
Mohamed Badawi's family originates from members of the Sufi order of the Qadiriyyah. Badawi has lived in Europe since 1984. From 1984 to 1993 he studied French, Arabic Studies, theoretical linguistics and German at the universities of Lyon and Konstanz. After graduation, he received a PhD degree from the linguistics department of the University of Konstanz in 1997. Currently, he lives with his family in Konstanz, Germany. 

He is the author of several textbooks on learning Arabic language and editor of the "As-Sabil Sammelbände für den Kulturpluralismus" series (As-Sabil anthologies for cultural pluralism), which compiles texts on culture and religion of the Arab World. He is also the owner of the "Badawi artes afro arabica" publishing company.

In municipal elections of 2019, he won the highest number of votes for an environmental group and became member of the Konstanz city council.

Music 
Mohamed Badawi is the founder, composer and singer of the bands "Badawi Band", "Diwan" and "El Nour Ensemble". Besides singing, he is also an oud player. In musical projects, he has worked with artists and musicians from several different countries.

"Sudan Education Project" 
Mohamed Badawi is also the founder of the "Sudan Education Project". Within the framework of this project, he designed a concept for the foundation of a European university in the greater area of Khartoum, the "Nihal European University". Another part of the project consists in aiding street children by giving them music education.

Selected publications 
 Mohamed Badawi / Christian A. Caroli: As-Sabil. Praktisches Lehrbuch zum Erlernen der Arabischen Sprache der Gegenwart, Band 1, Konstanz 2005.  (As-Sabil. Practical textbook for learning the Arabic language of today, volume 1)
 Mohamed Badawi / Christian A. Caroli: As-Sabil – Sammelbände für Kulturpluralismus, Band 1 (Europa und der Islam), Konstanz 2007.  (As-Sabil – Anthologies for cultural pluralism, volume 1 (Europe and Islam))
 Mohamed Badawi / Christian A. Caroli: As-Sabil: Grundlagen der arabischen Schrift, Konstanz 2008.  (As-Sabil: Basics of the Arab writing system)
 Mohamed Badawi / Christian A. Caroli: As-Sabil: Grundlagen der arabischen Verblehre, Konstanz 2008.  (As-Sabil: Basics of Arabic verbs)
 Mohamed Badawi / Christian A. Caroli: As-Sabil – Sammelbände für Kulturpluralismus, Band 2 (Das Aufeinandertreffen von Kulturen), Konstanz 2009.  (As-Sabil – Anthologies for cultural pluralism, volume 2 (The clash of cultures))

External links 
 Website of Mohamed Badawi
 Website of his publishing company Badawi artes afro arabica
 Website of the street children project in Sudan
 Website of the Nihal European University
 Website of the "Diwan" band (German)
 Website of the "El Nour Ensemble" (German)

References 

21st-century Sudanese male singers
People from Omdurman
1965 births
Living people
Academic staff of the University of Konstanz
21st-century Sudanese writers